North Thurston Public Schools, District No. 3 (NTPS) provides educational services for Lacey and parts of unincorporated Thurston County, Washington, including the Nisqually Tribe Reservation. NTPS is a Compassionate Learning Community and each year adopts a new project to support, ranging from the local food bank to community service. Their on-time graduation rates continue to rise and reached and record 92 percent in 2020.

It is the most diverse and largest school district in the county with award-winning arts, academics, athletics and CTE programs. They have 24 schools, including two new schools: Ignite Family Academy and Summit Virtual Academy. They have more than 15,000 students and 2,000 employees. It is the 23rd largest school district in the state of Washington.

The district chose "Including Everyone" as their 2021-22 annual theme to communicate its commitment to providing ALL students with access to high quality, inclusive learning experiences. This will also be a focus of professional development training in the coming school year around inclusionary practices and Universal Design for Learning. 

NTPS believes strongly in community partnerships and providing support for students in need. The Family & Youth Resource Center provides a one-stop destination for services and supplies, including food, school supplies and clothing, hygiene and laundry supplies. They also support intakes for McKinney-Vento (homeless youth), as well as showers, laundry and a space to meet with community partners. 

Points of Pride:    
18 Washington Achievement Awards; 
8 Schools if Distinction Awards; 
120+ National Board-Certified Teachers; 
5 Regional Teachers of the Year (ESD 113); 
More than 6,500 parent and community volunteers;  
800 students with speakers of 54 languages (ESL); 
Elementary Dual Language Program (Spanish/English); 
Family Education Program; 
Mentor Program;  
Military Support Program.

Location

Schools

Closed Schools 
South Sound High School - An alternative school of choice
New Century High School - An experimental school that ran on an evening/nighttime schedule.
Puget Sound High School - An alternative school that combined with New Century to form South Sound High School.

Student Demographics

References

External links
 
 North Thurston Education Foundation, local non-profit foundation

Lacey, Washington
Education in Thurston County, Washington
School districts in Washington (state)
1953 establishments in Washington (state)
School districts established in 1953